Checkpoint may refer to:

Places
 Border checkpoint, a place on the land border between two states where travellers and/or goods are inspected
 Security checkpoint, erected and enforced within contiguous areas under military or paramilitary control
 Random checkpoint, a police or military checkpoint that is moved to various locations
 Weigh station, a highway checkpoint to inspect vehicular weights

Arts and entertainment
 Checkpoint (G.I. Joe), a fictional character in the G.I. Joe universe
 Checkpoint (Transformers), two fictional characters in the Transformers universes
 Checkpoint (novel), a 2004 novel by Nicholson Baker
 Checkpoint (journal), 1969-1974
 Checkpoint (pinball), a 1991 pinball machine released by Data East
 Checkpoint (video gaming), locations in a video game where a player character respawns after death
 CheckPoint, a web series by sketch comedy group LoadingReadyRun

Film and television
 Checkpoint (1956 film), a British crime drama film 
 Checkpoint (2003 film), a documentary on checkpoints in the Occupied West Bank
 Checkpoint (Dutch TV show), a popular Dutch children's TV show
 "Checkpoint" (Buffy the Vampire Slayer), a 2001 episode of the television series Buffy the Vampire Slayer

Science and technology
 Counting point, a concept in logistics

Biology
 Cell cycle checkpoint, control mechanisms in eukaryotic cell division
 G1 restriction point
 S postreplication checkpoint, prevents cell cycle progression until postreplication repair
 G2-M DNA damage checkpoint
 M spindle checkpoint, prevents anaphase onset until all chromosomes are properly attached to the spindle
 Immune checkpoint

Computing
 Application checkpointing, a method in computing whereby the state of a program is saved
 Transaction checkpoint, for recovery in data management

Organisations
 Checkpoint Systems, a provider of merchandise availability solutions for the retail industry
 Checkpoint (rapid HIV testing facility), a former HIV testing facility based in Amsterdam
 Check Point, a software company that is best known for its firewall and VPN products
 Checkpoint, a tax and accounting database produced by Thomson Reuters

Sports
 Control point (orienteering) or checkpoint, a marked waypoint used in orienteering and related sports
 Racing checkpoint, a specific point partway through a racing course where a contestant's subtotal time is recorded

See also
 Checkpoint Charlie, a crossing point between East Berlin and West Berlin during the Cold War